The canton of Dieue-sur-Meuse is an administrative division of the Meuse department, northeastern France. It was created at the French canton reorganisation which came into effect in March 2015. Its seat is in Dieue-sur-Meuse.

It consists of the following communes:
 
Ambly-sur-Meuse
Ancemont
Autrécourt-sur-Aire
Bannoncourt
Baudrémont
Beaulieu-en-Argonne
Beausite
Belrain
Bouquemont
Brizeaux
Courcelles-en-Barrois
Courouvre
Dieue-sur-Meuse
Dompcevrin
Èvres
Foucaucourt-sur-Thabas
Fresnes-au-Mont
Génicourt-sur-Meuse
Gimécourt
Heippes
Ippécourt
Julvécourt
Kœur-la-Grande
Kœur-la-Petite
Lahaymeix
Landrecourt-Lempire
Lavallée
Lavoye
Lemmes
Levoncourt
Lignières-sur-Aire
Longchamps-sur-Aire
Ménil-aux-Bois
Les Monthairons
Neuville-en-Verdunois
Nicey-sur-Aire
Nixéville-Blercourt
Nubécourt
Osches
Pierrefitte-sur-Aire
Pretz-en-Argonne
Rambluzin-et-Benoite-Vaux
Récourt-le-Creux
Rupt-devant-Saint-Mihiel
Rupt-en-Woëvre
Saint-André-en-Barrois
Sampigny
Senoncourt-les-Maujouy
Seuil-d'Argonne
Sommedieue
Les Souhesmes-Rampont
Souilly
Thillombois
Tilly-sur-Meuse
Les Trois-Domaines
Vadelaincourt
Ville-devant-Belrain
Villers-sur-Meuse
Ville-sur-Cousances
Villotte-sur-Aire
Waly
Woimbey

References

Cantons of Meuse (department)